Marigny can refer to:

People
 Enguerrand de Marigny (1260-1315), chamberlain and minister of Philip IV the Fair
 Antoine Philippe de Marigny (1721-1779), colonial official in French Louisiana; geographer, cartographer, explorer
 Pierre de Marigny (1751-1800), father of Bernard de Marigny, son of Antoine Philippe de Marigny
 Bernard de Marigny (1785-1868), a Creole politician and developer in 19th century New Orleans
 Antoine James de Marigny (aka Mandeville de Marigny, 1811-1890), son of Bernard de Marigny, Louisiana planter and military officer
 Abel François Poisson, marquis de Marigny, brother to Madame de Pompadour and supervisor of the King's Buildings
 Alfred de Marigny, acquitted of the murder of Sir Harry Oakes in Nassau
 Charles de Bernard de Marigny, French admiral (1740-1816)
 Jean-Paul de Marigny, Australian football coach
 Jean Marigny (born 1939), French specialist on vampires and English literature academic

Places

Marigny is the name or part of the name of several communes in France:
 Marigny, Allier
 Marigny, Deux-Sèvres
 Marigny, Jura
 Marigny, Manche
 Marigny, Marne
 Marigny, Saône-et-Loire
 Marigny-Brizay, in the Vienne département
 Marigny-Chemereau, in the Vienne département
 Marigny-en-Orxois, in the Aisne département
 Marigny-le-Cahouët, in the Côte-d'Or département
 Marigny-le-Châtel, in the Aube département
 Marigny-le-Lozon, in the Manche département
 Marigny-l'Église, in the Nièvre département
 Marigny-lès-Reullée, in the Côte-d'Or département
 Marigny-les-Usages, in the Loiret département
 Marigny-Marmande, in the Indre-et-Loire département
 Marigny-Saint-Marcel, in the Haute-Savoie département
 Marigny-sur-Yonne, in the Nièvre département

Elsewhere
 Faubourg Marigny, a neighborhood of New Orleans, Louisiana, U.S.

Other
 Hôtel de Marigny, the official residence for State visitors in Paris
 Marigny Opera House, an opera house in New Orleans
 Théâtre Marigny, legitimate theatre in Paris
 Théâtre des Folies-Marigny, operetta theatre in Paris from 1864 to 1881